Young Eagles is a 1930 American pre-Code romantic drama film directed by William A. Wellman for Paramount Pictures. It stars Charles "Buddy" Rogers, Jean Arthur, and Paul Lukas. The story is based on the stories "The One Who Was Clever" and "Sky-High", written by American aviator and war hero Elliott White Springs. The film's hero is a "heroic combat aviator of the Lafayette Escadrille".

Wellman, himself a former pilot in the Lafayette Flying Corps, for whom aviation was a passion, directed the film, the last of his "unofficial trilogy" that included Wings (1927) and The Legion of the Condemned (1928). The director had hoped that the film would prove as popular as his acclaimed World War I aviation drama Wings, which had won the first Academy Award for Best Picture in 1927. Wellman cast Buddy Rogers again as his lead in the new film, but Young Eagles proved to be not as successful.

Plot
Lieutenant Robert Banks (Buddy Rogers), a young American aviator in the Lafayette Escadrille, on leave in Paris, meets Mary Gordon (Jean Arthur), a young American living abroad. Their romance is cut short by his return to the front. In an air battle, Robert brings down and captures von Baden, nicknamed the "Grey Eagle" (Paul Lukas), and takes him to Allied headquarters in Paris, to obtain intelligence on German plans.

Mary, ostensibly a spy for the Germans, drugs Robert, who awakens to find that his uniform has been stolen by von Baden. Later, in another air conflict, von Baden is wounded, but shoots down Robert's aircraft. The German rescues him, however, and takes him to an Allied hospital, assuring him of Mary's love; his faith in her is restored when Robert learns that Mary is actually an American spy.

Cast
 Charles "Buddy" Rogers as Lieutenant Robert Banks
 Jean Arthur as Mary Gordon
 Paul Lukas as Von Baden, the "Grey Eagle"
 Stuart Erwin as "Pudge" Higgins
 Virginia Bruce as Florence Welford
 Gordon De Main as Major Lewis
 James Finlayson as "Scotty"
 Frank Ross as Lieutenant Graham
 Jack Luden as Lieutenant Barker
 Freeman Wood as Lieutenant Mason
 George Irving as Colonel Wilder
 Stanley Blystone as Captain Deming

Production
Young Eagles called for only two scenes depicting air battles, with more of the action centered around a story of espionage and unrequited love. Wellman began pre-production in November 1927, making the decision to use aerial footage from Wings matched to new sequences.

Wellman hired veteran film pilot Leo Norris as the aerial coordinator, responsible for assembling a small fleet of World War I aircraft that included a SPAD VII and Thomas-Morse Scout. Other airworthy aircraft were obtained, such as American Eagle, Travel Air 2000 & 4000 and Waco biplanes that at least were close facsimiles of wartime aircraft.

Film sets for a wartime airfield were built at Lake Sherwood, California, with three weeks spent on location shooting. Two crash scenes were staged by Norris on location, with the second one nearly causing the death of the veteran movie pilot Dick Grace when he flipped his aircraft in a crash so violent that his shoes were ripped off his feet. He walked away with only minor bruises.

Reception
Young Eagles was released in the United States on March 21, 1930. A black-and-white mono (Western Electric Sound System) print with a running time 72 minutes was premiered at the Paramount Theater in New York. To promote the film at the premiere, an aircraft was on display inside the theater.

Critical response
Released only a month after Wellman's Dangerous Paradise, Young Eagles received  mixed reviews. The film was also not a commercial success, performing poorly at the U.S. box office. Wellman's portrayal of air warfare, however, received praise for its "... beauty and freedom of flight". Wellman and the crew expressed personal disappointment with how the film was received.  When unfavorable reviews began to come in, a distraught Wellman asked to be let out of his contract with Paramount, with the studio agreeing to sever ties with the acclaimed director.

Mordaunt Hall of The New York Times was extremely critical of the film, calling it a "... highly incredible narrative with two good air-fighting episodes and a mass of wild and absurd incidents ..." and noted that the "... pivotal idea is a stab at subtlety, but in mapping it out a Teutonic prisoner of war has to be extraordinarily gullible." He sarcastically added that the production "... could have been named 'Young Goats,' for Banks and another flying officer are evidently made the goats so that a spying expedition is helped along". Of the cast, Hall said, "Mr. Rogers's acting never rises above the level of the tale. Jean Arthur seems to be somewhat afraid of the character she plays. The only real performance is that of Paul Lukas as von Baden."

References

Notes

Citations

Bibliography

 Kelly, Shawna. Aviators in Early Hollywood. Mount Pleasant, South Carolina: Arcadia Publishing, 2008. .
 Mavis, Paul. The Espionage Filmography. Jefferson, North Carolina: McFarland & Company, 2013. .
 Orriss, Bruce W. When Hollywood Ruled the Skies: The Aviation Film Classics of World War I. Los Angeles: Aero Associates, 2013. .
 Slide, Anthony. Silent Players: A Biographical and Autobiographical Study of 100 Silent Film Actors and Actresses. Lexington, Kentucky: University Press of Kentucky, 2010. .
 Thompson, Frank T. William A. Wellman. Lanham, Maryland: Scarecrow Press, 1983. .
 Tibbetts, John C. and James M. Welsh. American Classic Screen Features. Lanham, Maryland: Scarecrow Press, 2010. .
 Villecco, Tony. Silent Stars Speak: Interviews with Twelve Cinema Pioneers. Jefferson, North Carolina: McFarland & Company, 2001. .

External links
 
 

American black-and-white films
American romantic drama films
American war films
American aviation films
Films about shot-down aviators
Films based on short fiction
Films directed by William A. Wellman
Films scored by John Leipold
Films set in Paris
Paramount Pictures films
War romance films
Western Front (World War I) films
World War I aviation films
World War I prisoner of war films
World War I spy films
1930 romantic drama films
1930 films
1930s English-language films
1930s American films